Scott Ford (born December 24, 1979) is a Canadian former professional ice hockey player. He is currently an assistant coach with the Milwaukee Admirals of the American Hockey League.

Playing career
Undrafted, Ford played for the Milwaukee Admirals, Bridgeport Sound Tigers, Brown Bears, Cleveland Barons, Dayton Bombers, Fresno Falcons, Providence Bruins, Trenton Titans, Utah Grizzlies, and Peoria Rivermen.

During the 2012–13 season, whilst with the Peoria Rivermen, Ford was traded by the St. Louis Blues to the Nashville Predators to mark a return to the Milwaukee Admirals in exchange for Jani Lajunen on February 19, 2013.

A free agent midway into the 2014–15 season, Ford belatedly signed an ECHL contract with the South Carolina Stingrays on December 6, 2014. It marked a return to the ECHL for the first time since 2007.

On September 8, 2015, it was announced that Ford would join the Milwaukee Admirals as an assistant coach for the 2015–16 season.

Career statistics

References

External links

1979 births
Living people
Bridgeport Sound Tigers players
Brown Bears men's ice hockey players
Canadian ice hockey defencemen
Cleveland Barons (2001–2006) players
Dayton Bombers players
Fresno Falcons players
Ice hockey people from British Columbia
Merritt Centennials players
Milwaukee Admirals players
People from Fort St. John, British Columbia
Peoria Rivermen (AHL) players
Providence Bruins players
South Carolina Stingrays players
Trenton Titans players
Utah Grizzlies (AHL) players